The Kuwait women's national cricket team represents the country of Kuwait in international women's cricket. The team is organised by Cricket Kuwait, which has been a member of the International Cricket Council (ICC) since 1998.

Kuwait made its international debut at the 2009 ACC Women's Twenty20 Championship in Malaysia. The team failed to win any of its matches in the group stage, and also lost to Qatar in the eleventh-place play-off, thus finishing twelfth and last overall. Kuwait had greater success at the tournament's 2011 edition, however, placing fourth of five teams in their group and then going on to defeat Bhutan in the seventh-place play-off. At the 2013 ACC Women's Championship, where matches were played over 25 overs, Kuwait won only a single game, against Singapore, and were ranked last of the eleven participants. Outside of Asian Cricket Council (ACC) tournaments, the team also competed in the inaugural edition of the Gulf Cricket Council (GCC) Women's Twenty20 Championship in 2014. They lost to the United Arab Emirates, and did not return for the following year's tournament, owing to scheduling conflict.

In April 2018, the ICC granted full Women's Twenty20 International (WT20I) status to all its members. Therefore, all Twenty20 matches played between Kuwait women and another international side after 1 July 2018 will be a full WT20I. Kuwait made their Twenty20 International debut against Malaysia in the 2019 ICC Women's Qualifier Asia at Bangkok on 18 February 2019.

In December 2020, the ICC announced the qualification pathway for the 2023 ICC Women's T20 World Cup. Kuwait were named in the 2021 ICC Women's T20 World Cup Asia Qualifier regional group, alongside seven other teams.

Records and statistics 
International Match Summary — Kuwait Women
 
Last updated 22 June 2022

Twenty20 International 

 Highest team total: 125/4 v. Bahrain on 25 March 2022 at Oman Cricket Academy Ground Turf 2, Muscat.
 Highest individual score: 54, Maryam Omar v. Bahrain on 26 March 2022 at Oman Cricket Academy Ground Turf 2, Muscat.
 Best individual bowling figures: 5/6, Maria Jasvi v. Saudi Arabia on 20 March 2022 at Oman Cricket Academy Ground Turf 2, Muscat.

T20I record versus other nations

Records complete to WT20I #1141. Last updated 22 June 2022.

See also
 List of Kuwait women Twenty20 International cricketers

References

Cricket in Kuwait
Cricket
Women's national cricket teams
Women
Cricket women